China competed at the 2007 World Championships in Athletics.

Medal winners

Liu Xiang won the gold medal in the Men's 110 metres hurdles.

Zhou Chunxiu won the silver medal in the Women's Marathon.

Zhang Wenxiu won the bronze medal in the Women's hammer throw.

References

External links
Results from IAAF.org
11th IAAF World Championships in Athletics Osaka Official Site
State Sport General Administration—sports authority provides relevant information

Nations at the 2007 World Championships in Athletics
World Championships in Athletics
China at the World Championships in Athletics